Rhagiops costulipennis is a species of beetle in the family Cerambycidae, and the only species in the genus Rhagiops. It was described by Fairmaire in 1898.

References

Dorcasominae
Beetles described in 1898
Monotypic beetle genera